AzTV or Azerbaijan Television is a state-controlled national television channel in Azerbaijan. It is the oldest television channel in the country, having first broadcast from Baku on 14 February 1956 in what was then the Azerbaijan Soviet Socialist Republic, Soviet Union.

Organisation
The channel has been owned since 2005 by the Azerbaijan Television and Radio Broadcasting Closed Joint-stock Company, of which the national government is the only shareholder. This company also owns the channels İdman Azərbaycan TV (Sport Azerbaijan TV) and Mədəniyyət TV (Culture TV).

In 2007, an application by AzTV to join the European Broadcasting Union was rejected after the channel was found to be too closely associated with the ruling government.

Programming
The channel starts its daily broadcast by airing National anthem of Azerbaijan. Programming on AzTV primarily consists of news, talk shows, documentaries, music shows, and feature films.

Technology
Their 1st shows (including music videos) that were recorded in 1956 are stored on film. In 1965, the studio switched to using videotape recording since it became affordable and the quality of their produced shows (including music videos) increased. AzTV maintains a huge archive of all their saved TV programming that was recorded from 1956–present. All of their shows are preserved on different film and videotape formats.

Broadcast area
, 99.96% of the population of Azerbaijan is able to receive AzTV via terrestrial, cable, or satellite broadcasting, giving it the largest coverage area of any Azerbaijani television channel.

In addition to broadcasting domestically, AzTV broadcasts internationally on the internet and via free-to-air satellite to Europe, North America, and portions of North Africa, the Middle East, and Central Asia.

References

External links

 Official website 
 Official website 

Television stations in Azerbaijan
Television networks in Azerbaijan
Azerbaijani-language television stations
Television channels and stations established in 1956
1956 establishments in the Soviet Union
1956 establishments in Azerbaijan